Eupithecia juncalensis is a moth in the family Geometridae. It is found in the Valparaíso Region (Aconcagua Province) in Chile. The habitat consists of the Central Valley Biotic Province.

The length of the forewings is about 9 mm for males and 9.5 mm for females. The forewings are pale grey, with numerous grey and brown scales, resulting in a somewhat mottled appearance. The hindwings are greyish, with dark scaling along the anal margin. Adults have been recorded on wing in November.

Etymology
The specific name is based on the type locality.

References

Moths described in 1987
juncalensis
Moths of South America
Endemic fauna of Chile